Laura and the Lovers was a Lithuanian pop band. It is most known for representing Lithuania at Eurovision Song Contest 2005.

In Eurovision 2005, Laura and the Lovers performed a song called "Little by Little" The song was performed 2nd in the running order after Austria and before Portugal. The song was not announced as one of the top 10 qualifiers and was later confirmed to have finished last (25th) in the semifinal with 17 points.

Discography

Albums
 Tarp krintančių lapų (2006)

Singles
 "Little by Little" (2005)

References 

Eurovision Song Contest entrants for Lithuania
Eurovision Song Contest entrants of 2005
Lithuanian pop music groups